Robert Eastman Woodruff (September 11, 1884 – 1957) was president of the Erie Railroad from 1939 to 1949.

References 
 

1884 births
1957 deaths
20th-century American railroad executives
Erie Railroad